Patrick Bach (born 30 March 1968) is a German actor and voice actor. His parents are Beate Molina and lawyer Horst Bach. 
He was discovered while playing a football game and was given the title role in the miniseries Silas, based on the books by Cecil Bødker. 

Bach is best known for his lead roles in the two miniseries Silas (1981) and Jack Holborn (1982). 
He is married, with two children, and currently lives with his family in Hamburg. He is the German voice of Samwise Gamgee in Peter Jackson's The Lord of the Rings film trilogy and Twoflower in Terry Pratchett's The Colour of Magic.

Bibliography
 Holmstrom, John. The Moving Picture Boy: An International Encyclopaedia from 1895 to 1995. Norwich, Michael Russell, 1996, p. 370-371.

External links

Patrick Bach's official homepage (German)
Patrick Bach at Actors Connection (German)

1968 births
German male child actors
German male film actors
German male television actors
German male voice actors
20th-century German male actors
21st-century German male actors
Living people